Kamienka (Kamiunka; , Kamionka) is a village and municipality in Stará Ľubovňa District in the Prešov Region of northern Slovakia. The village is traditionally inhabited by Rusyns, as one of their westernmost settlements.

History
In historical records the village was first mentioned in 1342.

Geography
It has a population of about 1409 people.

Genealogical resources

The records for genealogical research are available at the state archive "Statny Archiv in Levoca, Slovakia"

 Roman Catholic church records (births/marriages/deaths): 1624-1945 (parish B)
 Greek Catholic church records (births/marriages/deaths): 1787-1924 (parish A)

Here were born two Greek-Catholic bishops, Ivan Bradach (1732–1772) and his younger brother Mykhaylo Bradach (1748–1815)

See also
 List of municipalities and towns in Slovakia

External links
https://web.archive.org/web/20070513023228/http://www.statistics.sk/mosmis/eng/run.html
Surnames of living people in Kamienka

Villages and municipalities in Stará Ľubovňa District